"The Stars and Stripes Forever" is a march by American composer John Philip Sousa.

Stars and Stripes Forever may also refer to:

 Stars and Stripes Forever (film), a 1952 biopic about John Philip Sousa, starring Clifton Webb, Debra Paget, Robert Wagner, and Ruth Hussey
 Stars and Stripes Forever, a 1998 science fiction novel by Harry Harrison, the first book in the Stars and Stripes trilogy
 Stars & Stripes Forever (album) by the Nitty Gritty Dirt Band
 "The Stars and Stripes Forever", a song from the 2003 album The Civil War by Matmos
 "Stars and Stripes Forever", an assortment of action figures released by Toys "R" Us to celebrate the 15th anniversary of the G.I. Joe: A Real American Hero toyline

See also 
 Stars & Stripes (disambiguation)